John McEachern High School or McEachern High School is a public high school established in 1908 in Powder Springs, Georgia, United States. It was originally established as the Seventh District Agricultural and Mechanical School. Due to its history, McEachern has an open campus, with its buildings spaced across the property. It is one of 17 high schools in Cobb County School District.

Notable alumni

 Morris Almond – drafted 25th overall by the Utah Jazz in the 2007 NBA Draft; played for Rice University; first basketball player in McEachern school history to have his jersey retired
 Kofi Amichia – offensive guard for the Green Bay Packers
 Tremayne Anchrum – Super Bowl Champion and Guard for the Los Angeles Rams of the National Football League (NFL). He played college football at Clemson. 
 Rory Anderson – football tight end for the San Francisco 49ers of the NFL; drafted in the 7th round of the 2015 NFL Draft by the 49ers; played college football at South Carolina
 Gregg Bishop – film director, screenwriter and producer
 Sharife Cooper – point guard for the Cleveland Charge, drafted 48th in the 2nd round of the 2021 NBA Draft
 Te'a Cooper – point guard for the Los Angeles Sparks, drafted 18th in the 2nd round of the 2020 WNBA Draft
 Elle Duncan – sports anchor for ESPN, former v-103 traffic reporter, tv host, actress and television personality
 Chuma Edoga – offensive tackle for the New York Jets, drafted 92nd in the 3rd round; played college for the University of Southern California
 Lissa Endriga – international model; TV host of the travel show Destination X
 Ted Laurent – defensive lineman for the Hamilton Tiger-Cats and Ole Miss Rebels
 Mark Lee – lead guitarist for the four-time Grammy Award-winning band Third Day; graduated in 1991
 Gerald McRath – linebacker for Southern Miss.; drafted by the Tennessee Titans in the 2009 NFL Draft as an outside linebacker; graduated 2004
 Adam Meadows – four-year starter for the University of Georgia; drafted by the Indianapolis Colts
 Patrick N. Millsaps – Chief of Staff of Newt Gingrich's 2012 presidential campaign; political analyst on Fox News, CNN and MSNBC; graduated in 1991
 Isaac Okoro – small forward for the Cleveland Cavaliers, drafted 5th overall in the 2020 NBA Draft; played for Auburn University
 Chris Pope – Internet personality; executive producer; celebrity social media publicist; co-founder of Guys from Andromeda LLC
 Mac Powell – lead singer of the four-time Grammy Award-winning band Third Day; graduated in 1991
 Doc Shaw – actor, best known for role as Malik Payne in Tyler Perry's House of Payne
 Josh Smith – NBA basketball player

References

External links
 

Schools in Cobb County, Georgia
Public high schools in Georgia (U.S. state)
Educational institutions established in 1908
1908 establishments in Georgia (U.S. state)